Chalepini is a tribe of leaf beetles in the family Chrysomelidae. There are at least 50 genera and 830 described species in Chalepini.

Genera
 Acanthodes Baly, 1864
 Acritispa Uhmann, 1940
 Agathispa Weise, 1905
 Anisochalepus Uhmann, 1940
 Anisostena Weise, 1910
 Baliosus Weise, 1905
 Bothrispa Uhmann, 1940
 Brachycoryna Guérin-Méneville, 1844
 Bruchia Weise, 1906
 Carinispa Uhmann, 1930
 Chalepispa Uhmann, 1955
 Chalepotatus Weise, 1910
 Chalepus Thunberg, 1805
 Charistena Baly, 1864
 Clinocarispa Uhmann, 1935
 Cnetispa Maulik, 1930
 Corynispa Uhmann, 1940
 Craspedonispa Weise, 1910
 Decatelia Weise, 1904
 Euprionota Guérin-Méneville, 1844
 Fossispa Staines, 1989
 Glyphuroplata Uhmann, 1937
 Goyachalepus Pic, 1929
 Heptachispa Uhmann, 1953
 Heptatomispa Uhmann, 1940
 Heptispa Weise, 1906
 Heterispa Chapuis, 1875
 Metazycera Chevrolat in Dejean, 1836
 Microrhopala Chevrolat in Dejean, 1836
 Mimoethispa Pic, 1927
 Nanocthispa Monrós and Viana, 1947
 Nonispa Maulik, 1933
 Octhispa Chapuis, 1877
 Octotoma Dejean, 1836
 Octuroplata Uhmann, 1940
 Odontispa Uhmann, 1940
 Odontota Chevrolat in Dejean, 1836
 Oxychalepus Uhmann, 1937
 Oxyroplata Uhmann, 1940
 Parvispa Uhmann, 1940
 Pentispa Chapuis, 1875
 Physocoryna Guérin-Méneville, 1844
 Platocthispa Uhmann, 1939
 Probaenia Weise, 1904
 Spaethispa Uhmann, 1939
 Stenopodius Horn, 1883
 Sternocthispa Uhmann, 1938
 Sternoplispa Uhmann, 1940
 Sternostena Weise, 1910
 Sternostenoides Monrós and Viana, 1947
 Stethispa Baly, 1864
 Sumitrosis Butte, 1969
 Temnochalepus Uhmann, 1935
 Temnocthispa Uhmann, 1939
 Uroplata Chevrolat in Dejean, 1836
 Xenochalepus Weise, 1910

References

 Bouchard, P., Y. Bousquet, A. Davies, M. Alonso-Zarazaga, J. Lawrence, C. Lyal, A. Newton, et al. (2011). "Family-group names in Coleoptera (Insecta)". ZooKeys, vol. 88, 1–972.
 Riley, Edward G., Shawn M. Clark, and Terry N. Seeno (2003). "Catalog of the leaf beetles of America north of Mexico (Coleoptera: Megalopodidae, Orsodacnidae and Chrysomelidae, excluding Bruchinae)". Coleopterists Society Special Publication no. 1, 290.
 Staines, C. L. (2002). "The New World tribes and genera of hispines (Coleoptera: Chrysomelidae: Cassidinae)". Proceedings of the Entomological Society of Washington, vol. 104, no. 3, 721–784.
 Uhmann, Erich (1957). "Chrysomelidae: Hispinae, Hispinae Americanae". Coleopterorum Catalogus Supplementa, Pars 35, Fasc. 1, vii + 153.

Further reading

 Arnett, R. H. Jr., M. C. Thomas, P. E. Skelley and J. H. Frank. (eds.). (21 June 2002). American Beetles, Volume II: Polyphaga: Scarabaeoidea through Curculionoidea. CRC Press LLC, Boca Raton, Florida .
 Arnett, Ross H. (2000). American Insects: A Handbook of the Insects of America North of Mexico. CRC Press.
 Richard E. White. (1983). Peterson Field Guides: Beetles. Houghton Mifflin Company.

Cassidinae
Beetle tribes